Orcs Must Die! is an action-tower defense video game developed and published by Robot Entertainment and Mastertronic. It is a tower defense game that eschews the traditional top-down view of similar games, instead using a third-person action-oriented viewpoint. After being demonstrated at Penny Arcade Expo East 2011, the game was released via Xbox Live Arcade on October 5, 2011, and for Windows PCs on October 12, 2011.

Gameplay

Orcs Must Die! is a variant of a tower defense game; the player as the War Mage must defend one or more Rifts on each level from an onslaught of orcs and other creatures that emerge from one or more entrances and traverse the level.  Generally, each orc that reaches a Rift deducts a point from the starting Rift Score while specialized orcs may take off more points; if the Rift Score drops to zero, the level is lost and the player will have to start again.

The orc armies arrive in increasingly more difficult waves, with each level having between four and twelve waves. In general, waves will begin a few seconds after the player defeats the prior one, but roughly every three waves on all bar Nightmare difficulty, the player is given a break where they can set up traps and initiate the next wave when they are ready.

As the War Mage, the player has the ability to place numerous traps and arm themselves with weapons and equipment to defeat the orcs. The player selects a number of traps and equipment (up to ten) from their current Spellbook; once the player starts placing traps they will be bound to this selection. Traps can be placed on any appropriate surface, but each trap costs in-game currency to place, and traps will have variable costs based on their effectiveness. Traps typically work once and then have a reset period before they will activate again. Such traps include floor, wall, and ceiling traps, and several Guardians that will act on their own accord. The player is given an amount of money to spend on trap placement at the start, and earns more by defeating the orcs and after completing waves; money can also be dropped by certain monsters that must be collected by the player. Traps can be placed at any time, including in combat, and between waves, placed traps can be removed and refunded for their cost. Later, the player gains access to Weavers, who for various costs can boost certain effects on the player or traps placed in the manner of a technology tree; these effects only last for that level.

Once the player initiates a wave, they can run about the level to participate in combat or place additional traps.  The player must watch their health and mana used for their weapons but orcs may drop health and mana potions that will replenish these; alternatively the player can heal while in proximity of the Rift. If the player should lose all their health or fall off the level, they will respawn back at the Rift but this will cost them a number of Rift Points.

After defeating the last wave, the player is awarded a number of skulls, up to 5 (or on Apprentice difficulty, limited to two), based on their score (reflecting how many Rift points remain) and the time needed to defeat all the waves.  Skulls are used to buy improvements to traps and weapons in the player's spellbook, such as increasing damage, reducing cost, or making them more effective against the orcs. The player, after completing each level the first time, is also rewarded with a new trap type for their Spellbook they can use in subsequent levels. These improvements remain with the player, so that they may return to earlier levels with these improved traps to earn more skulls.

Plot
The story revolves around the Order, an elite faction of wizards and warriors who guard the Rifts, magical openings between the human world and the 'Dead World', which provide a source of magical power throughout both worlds. Using this power, the Order is able to maintain a perfect world for humanity by using magic to manipulate nature. In order to protect the human world, they have constructed magic-powered fortresses throughout the Dead World to guard the Rifts, particularly from the adversarial faction known as 'the Mob' - a brutish horde of creatures such as Orcs, Ogres and Gnolls which, despite being unintelligent, would otherwise pose a major threat to the human world due to their vast numbers.

After a surprise attack by the Mob, the player character, known only as the Hero (voiced by Rob McCollum), finds himself as the last living member of the Order, as the Mob appears to have suddenly obtained a surge in both strength and intelligence. Taking it upon himself to defend the human world, he defends the fortresses from the Mob one by one (much to the bewilderment of his teacher, who narrates the storyline). The Hero eventually learns that the Mob has been empowered by the Sorceress (voiced by Colleen Clinkenbeard), a past student of the Order who, despite showing overwhelming potential to help defend humanity, instead chose to seek power for herself and used magic to seize control of the Mob.

As the Mob's attacks become more and more aggressive, the Hero eventually chooses to ensure the safety of the human world by stepping back through a Rift and closing them all forever by means of a simple spell. Although this means that the Mob can never reach the human world, it also means that humanity is no longer able to use magic to sustain itself, and the whole world, which has become dependent on magic, begins to deteriorate. In the Dead World, the Sorceress is rendered powerless as the Rifts can no longer provide her with magic, and she is left at the mercy of the Mob, who have been reduced to their original, savage state.

Development and release

Reception

The game received "favorable" reviews on both platforms according to the review aggregation website Metacritic.

Joystiq called the Xbox 360 version a "finely-tuned whirling chamber of death". IGN praised the length of the campaign as well as the combat system. It sold over 50,000 units on Xbox and substantially more on PC.

Sequels

Orcs Must Die! 2 was announced by Robot Entertainment on April 2, 2012 and released on July 30, 2012. The sequel includes two-player co-op with the introduction of the Sorceress in a playable role. Orcs Must Die! Unchained, the third game in the series, initially released as a beta version in 2014, was released on April 18, 2017 for the Windows platform, while the PlayStation 4 version was released on July 18, 2017. It was released under a free-to-play model.

Orcs Must Die! 3 was announced during a Stadia connect on August 19, 2019. It released on Stadia with single-player and two-player co-op on July 14, 2020 as a timed exclusive. Robot Entertainment has not yet announced when it will launch on other platforms. Unlike previous games, which generally had a dungeon and Tower Defense design with limited pathways for enemies to attack from, Orcs Must Die! 3 features larger, open battlefields in a feature called "War Scenarios."

References

External links
 Official website

2011 video games
Fantasy video games
Microsoft games
Tower defense video games
Video games developed in the United States
Video games with expansion packs
Windows games
Xbox 360 Live Arcade games
Mastertronic games
Orcs in popular culture
D.I.C.E. Award for Strategy/Simulation Game of the Year winners
Robot Entertainment games